Dante Viviani  (25 July 1861 – 13 October 1917) was an Italian architect, active mainly in Umbria and his native Tuscany.

Biography

He designed numerous buildings in his native Arezzo and in Umbria, and contributed to the restoration and renovation of ancient palaces and churches in old towns such as Assisi, Città di Castello, Gubbio, Perugia and Todi. Between 1901 and 1914 he designed the new façade of the Arezzo Cathedral in a Gothic Revival style.

References

Bibliography

External links

19th-century Italian architects
20th-century Italian architects
Architects from Tuscany
1861 births
1917 deaths
People from Arezzo